Theory and Decision is a peer-reviewed multidisciplinary journal of decision science published quarterly by Springer Science+Business Media.  It was first published in 1970. The current editor-in-chief is Mohammed Abdellaoui. The journal publishes research in fields such as economics, game theory, management science, and artificial intelligence.

References

External links
Official Website

Economics journals
Publications established in 1970
Springer Science+Business Media academic journals
Logic journals